Datuk Seri Tan Chai Ho (born 7 February 1949) was Deputy Minister of Ministry of Home Affairs (Malaysia) from 29 March 2004 to 26 February 2008. He was a Member of Parliament of (P124) Bandar Tun Razak in Wilayah Persekutuan (Federal Territory) of Malaysia) representing the National Front (Barisan Nasional) coalition for 3 terms until he lost to Tan Sri Abdul Khalid Ibrahim of Parti Keadilan Rakyat (PKR) in the 2008 general election. He subsequently announced that he will retire from politics prior to the 2013 general election.

Education 
Tan underwent his primary education at SJK (C) Kepong, Kuala Lumpur from 1956 to 1961. He then completed his Senior Cambridge secondary education in 1967, and subsequently Form Six In 1969. His was a company secretary by profession.

Political background

Position history
Positions held in the private sector : 
Family business in Company Secretarial Services. Director of Kojadi Cooperation

Positions held in the Malaysian cabinet
  i) 11 May 1995 – 13 May 1999 – Appointed as Parliamentary Secretary to the Ministry of Domestic Trade & Consumer Affairs.
 ii) 14 December 1999 – Mac 2004 Appointed as Deputy Minister of the Ministry of Energy, Communications & Multimedia.
iii) 29 March 2004 – 26 February 2008 Appointed as Deputy Minister of the Ministry Of Home Affairs .

Election results

Honours
  :
  Member of the Order of the Defender of the Realm (AMN) (1983)
  Officer of the Order of the Defender of the Realm (KMN) (1990)
  Commander of Order of Meritorious Service (PJN) – Datuk (1996)
  :
  Grand Commander of the Order of the Territorial Crown (SMW) – Datuk Seri (2009)

References

External links
 MCAWP.Net e-Service Forum
 Ministry of Home Affairs
 MCA Wilayah Persekutuan
 Malaysian Chinese Association
 2004 General Elections Results 2004 General Elections Results
 MCAWP.Net (created by MCA Youth Information Technology Bureau as a portal for e-Services, Datuk Tan Chai Ho's program, discussion forum and community news)
 Previously old website is no longer available

Living people
1949 births
People from Selangor
Malaysian politicians of Chinese descent
Malaysian Buddhists
Malaysian Chinese Association politicians
Members of the Dewan Rakyat
Members of the Dewan Negara
Members of the Order of the Defender of the Realm
Officers of the Order of the Defender of the Realm
Commanders of the Order of Meritorious Service